Compass is a Canadian documentary and current affairs television program which aired on CBC Television from 1965 to 1966.

Premise
This program featured documentaries by emerging producers, many of whom contributed to This Hour Has Seven Days. Aired between regular television seasons, Compass was often experimental in its approach. Like This Hour Has Seven Days, Compass was broadcast on Sunday nights.

Participating producers during the program included Alex Brown, Beryl Fox, Sam Levene, Ross McLean, Brian O'Leary, Peter Pearson, David Ruskin, Glenn Sarty, Patrick Watson, and Larry Zolf.

Scheduling
This half-hour program was broadcast on Sundays at 10:00 p.m. (Eastern time) from 11 July to 12 September 1965 in the first year, and 3 July to 21 August 1966 in the second.

1965 season

1966 season

References

External links
 

CBC Television original programming
1965 Canadian television series debuts
1966 Canadian television series endings
1960s Canadian documentary television series